Quincy Adams may refer to: 

 Quincy Adams station, a rapid transit station in Quincy, Massachusetts, United States
 Mount Quincy Adams (Fairweather Range), on the border between Canada and Alaska, United States
 Mount Quincy Adams, a subsidiary peak of Mount Adams (New Hampshire), New Hampshire, United States

See also